The 1986 Italian Grand Prix was a Formula One motor race held at Monza on 7 September 1986. It was the thirteenth race of the 1986 Formula One World Championship.

The 51-lap race was won by Brazilian driver Nelson Piquet, driving a Williams-Honda. Piquet's British teammate and Drivers' Championship rival, Nigel Mansell, finished second, with Swede Stefan Johansson third in a Ferrari. The other two championship challengers, Frenchman Alain Prost and Brazilian Ayrton Senna, both failed to finish, Senna suffering a transmission failure in his Lotus-Renault at the very start of the race and Prost being disqualified halfway through for illegally switching to his spare McLaren-TAG after the start of the formation lap.

The win moved Piquet into second place in the Drivers' Championship, five points behind Mansell and three ahead of Prost, with three races remaining.

Qualifying report
He was followed by four more BMW-powered cars: teammate Teo Fabi, the Brabhams of Derek Warwick and Riccardo Patrese, and the Arrows of Thierry Boutsen. The fastest non-BMW powered car was the Williams-Honda of Nigel Mansell, with a top speed  slower than that of Berger.

Despite this, Berger could only qualify fourth, while Fabi took his second consecutive pole position. Alain Prost lined up alongside Fabi on the front row, despite being nearly half a second slower in his McLaren-TAG and recording a top speed over  slower than Berger's. Drivers' Championship leader Mansell was third, ahead of Berger, while Brazilian pair Ayrton Senna (Lotus-Renault) and Nelson Piquet (Williams-Honda) made up the third row. The top 10 was completed by Warwick, Keke Rosberg in the second McLaren, Michele Alboreto in the Ferrari and Patrese; Alboreto's position was notable as he had missed the first day of qualifying after injuring his arm in a motorcycle crash.

The race saw the debut of local driver Alex Caffi, deputising for Allen Berg at Osella, as well as the debut of the French AGS team, whose Motori Moderni-powered JH21C was driven by another local driver, Ivan Capelli. With the number of entries increased to 27 at both this race and the next race in Portugal, FISA decided to allow all the cars to start. Caffi was the beneficiary of this decision, starting 27th behind Capelli and Osella teammate Piercarlo Ghinzani.

Qualifying classification

Race report
Following problems at the start of the formation lap, pole position man Teo Fabi was forced to start from the back of the grid and Alain Prost, alongside him on the front row, had to start from the pit lane in the spare car. At the green light, Gerhard Berger took the lead, but on lap eight lost positions to first Mansell, Piquet, and an on-form Alboreto in the Ferrari. Ayrton Senna was out with a broken gearbox at the start. Alboreto looked to be in challenging the Williams duo for the lead having overtaken Rosberg, Arnoux and Berger before spinning at the exit of the first chicane. Like the British Grand Prix, the race became a close fight between the two Williams drivers, but this time Piquet hunted down his teammate British driver Nigel Mansell to take the victory. Piquet defeated Mansell in a straight fight, leading the Briton home by 9.828 seconds. The Brazilian managed to pass Mansell at the Curva Grande to go on and claim his fourth win of the season. Behind, Fabi and Prost had charged from the rear and by lap 12 were running 8th and 9th. Prost was disqualified for changing cars after the start of the formation lap, which was illegal, but his engine blew up a lap after he was flagged anyway. Johansson charged early in the race, passing Rosberg and Arnoux on lap five to go on to finish third.

Race classification

Championship standings after the race

Drivers' Championship standings

Constructors' Championship standings

References

Italian Grand Prix
Grand Prix
Italian Grand Prix
September 1986 sports events in Europe